Rimjingang (or Rimjin-gang) is a North Korean magazine published by Asia Press which is based in Osaka, Japan.

About
In 2007, Asia Press began publishing a magazine entitled Rimjin-gang: News from Inside North Korea in Korean and Japanese.  It was started by a Japanese and Korean co-joint editorial group, a chief editor and Japanese journalist, Jiro Ishimaru, and a Korean representative editor, Choi Jin I, author and North Korean defector.

Rimjingang secretly operates with journalists and reporters hidden within North Korea. The magazine aims to bring outside news to the people of North Korea. The reporters, North Korean civilians and defectors who receive media training in China from the Asia Press North Korea reporting team, are able to use techniques such as hidden cameras to create their articles. Reporters learn journalistic principles as well as personal computer skills.

After the fourth issue of the Korean edition was released, Choi Jin I left the group and began releasing her own periodical called Imjingang in the Korean language in Seoul in April 2009.

One of the major reasons for the "divergence" was said to be that Imjingang intended to be rather a communication tool for defectors and North Koreans while Rimjingang aspires to be a project purely for journalistic activities and to foster journalists and journalism in North Korea. Since then, Choi Jin I has made Imjingang a completely independent magazine, which is no longer connected with Asia Press. Rimjingang, published in Japanese/English, in Japan and Imjingang published in South Korea are no longer related.

Rimjingang's reports are smuggled out of North Korea via China and printed in Japan. Their pictures and footage have been delivered to major newspapers and magazines all over the world, such as The Washington Post, The Economist, The Nation, The Wall Street Journal, and the Japan Times. Rimjingang'''s reports were quoted by the New York Times and Newsweek magazine. For TV, it was aired on various stations such as BBC (UK), Channel 4 (UK), KBS (South Korea), ARD (Germany), Al-Jazeera (Arabic Satellite), ABC (Australia), TBS and TV-Asahi (Japan), PBS (United States), etc.

In 2010, the magazine published a video of a woman foraging for food in North Korea which received worldwide attention.

Currently, the Japanese edition of the magazine is published periodically. In October 2010, Rimjingang released its first English hardcover edition.

The name Rimjingang is also the North Korean name for the Imjin River, which crosses the demilitarized zone and flows into South Korea from the North. One of the magazine's North Korean journalists chose this name to symbolize sending the thoughts of the North Korean people to their brothers and sisters in the South.

Staff

Editors of Rimjingang
Jiro Ishimaru and Lee Jinsu.

North Korean Reporters of Rimjingang
(Reporters inside North Korea work under assumed names)
Kim Dong Cheol, Lee Song Hui, Paek Hyang, Shim Ui Chun, Chang Jeong Gil, Lee Jun, Kae Myung Bin, and Gu Gwang Ho.

See also

 Chollima (magazine)
 Choson Sinbo
 Chongryon

References

External links
 
 Tribute to brave North Korean journalist about Rimjin-gang''s reporters
 Undercover North magazine now in English
 NPR News article - Magazine's Clandestine Look At Life In North Korea
 CPJ/News with a genuine North Korea dateline
 PBS RONTLINE "Secret State of North Korea" - Life Under Kim Jong-un

Magazines published in North Korea
Magazines established in 2007
Mass media in Osaka
News magazines published in Asia